143P/Kowal–Mrkos is a periodic comet in the Solar System.

References

External links 
 Orbital simulation from JPL (Java) / Horizons Ephemeris
 143P/Kowal-Mrkos – Seiichi Yoshida @ aerith.net
 143P at Kronk's Cometography

Periodic comets
0143
Discoveries by Charles T. Kowal
Comets in 2018
19840423